Andrei Anatolyevich Miezin (born 8 July 1974) is a Belarusian ice hockey coach and a retired goaltender.

Playing career 
Mezin left his native Belarus in 1993 to head to North America and would spend five seasons playing in different leagues, including the American Hockey League, the International Hockey League and the United Hockey League. From 1998 to 2002, he played in Germany: one year with the Nürnberg Ice Tigers and three with the Berlin Capitals. He then played in Russia and the Czech Republic. Starting 2008, he spent time with KHL teams HC Dinamo Minsk, Lokomotiv Yaroslavl, Traktor Chelyabinsk and Avangard Omsk.

Mezin gained international attention in 2002 as a member of the Belarus national men's ice hockey team at the 2002 Winter Olympics. Despite not winning a game in the Group D round robin, Belarus beat the Sweden national men's ice hockey team in the quarterfinals. Mezin was stellar, holding a star-laden Swedish team to three goals on more than 50 shots. The game was won by Belarus late in the third on a long shot gaffe made by Tommy Salo in the Swedish net. Belarus ended up finishing in fourth place after losing to Canada in the semifinals. Mezin has represented the Belarus national team at the 1998, 2002 and 2010 Olympic Games and played several World Championships.

On 1 October 2008 Mezin and Metallurg Magnitogorsk faced the New York Rangers of the NHL in the inaugural Victoria Cup. Mezin stopped 40 out of 44 shots, playing a very respectable game in the 4–3 loss.

Mezin retired in 2014.

Coaching career 
He has been serving as goaltender coach of HC Dinamo Minsk of the Kontinental Hockey League (KHL) since 2016.

Off the ice
In the offseason, Mezin lives in Kyiv, Ukraine.

Career statistics

Awards and honours 
 Belarus Player of the Year (1998, 1999, 2005, 2006)
 All-Star Team (WC 2006, WC 2009)

References

External links 
 

1974 births
Ak Bars Kazan players
Avangard Omsk players
Belarusian expatriate sportspeople in the United States
Belarusian ice hockey goaltenders
Berlin Capitals players
Russian ice hockey goaltenders
HC Dinamo Minsk players
Ice hockey players at the 1998 Winter Olympics
Ice hockey players at the 2002 Winter Olympics
Ice hockey players at the 2010 Winter Olympics
Las Vegas Thunder players
Living people
Metallurg Magnitogorsk players
Olympic ice hockey players of Belarus
Roanoke Express players
Sportspeople from Chelyabinsk
Salavat Yulaev Ufa players
SKA Saint Petersburg players
Belarusian expatriate sportspeople in Canada
Belarusian expatriate sportspeople in the Czech Republic
Belarusian expatriate sportspeople in Germany
Belarusian expatriate ice hockey people
Expatriate ice hockey players in Germany
Expatriate ice hockey players in the Czech Republic
Expatriate ice hockey players in Canada
Expatriate ice hockey players in the United States
Belarusian ice hockey coaches